Javier "Javi" Jiménez Moreno (born 11 January 1996) is a Spanish footballer who plays for Málaga CF as a left back.

Club career
Born in Quesada, Jaén, Andalusia, Jiménez represented CD Úbeda Viva and Villarreal CF as a youth. He made his senior debut with the C-team on 11 January 2015, starting in a 0–1 Tercera División away loss against CD Castellón.

Jiménez scored his first senior goals on 13 March 2016, netting a brace in a 5–2 home routing of UD Benigànim. In July, he signed for Málaga CF, being assigned to the reserves also in the fourth division.

On 30 July 2017, Jiménez signed a three-year deal with Segunda División club Gimnàstic de Tarragona, after cutting ties with Málaga. He made his professional debut on 20 August, starting in a 0–1 home loss against UD Almería.

On 31 January 2019, after struggling with injuries, Jiménez terminated his contract with Nàstic and signed a two-and-a-half-year deal with Cultural y Deportiva Leonesa in the third division. On 30 August, he moved to UE Cornellà also in division three.

On 11 August 2020, Jiménez returned to the second division after agreeing to a one-year deal with CD Mirandés. The following 16 June, he returned to Málaga on a two-year contract, now being assigned to the main squad also in the second division.

References

External links

1996 births
Living people
Spanish footballers
Sportspeople from the Province of Jaén (Spain)
Association football defenders
Segunda División players
Segunda División B players
Tercera División players
Villarreal CF C players
Atlético Malagueño players
Gimnàstic de Tarragona footballers
Cultural Leonesa footballers
UE Cornellà players
CD Mirandés footballers
Málaga CF players
Spain youth international footballers